Where Have All Our Heroes Gone is a studio album by American country singer-songwriter Bill Anderson. It was released in December 1970 on Decca Records and was produced by Owen Bradley. It was Anderson's fifteenth studio album as a recording artist and his third studio album released in 1970. The album's title track became a major hit on the Billboard country chart. The album itself would also reach peak positions on the Billboard country albums chart.

Background and content
Where Have All Our Heroes Gone was recorded in August 1970 at Bradley's Barn, a studio located in Mount Juliet, Tennessee. The recording sessions were produced by Owen Bradley. It was Anderson's fifteenth studio album and fifth to be produced by Bradley The album consisted of 11 tracks. The project was designed to be a collection of recitation songs. Anderson presented the title track as which impressed Bradley and other engineers on the project. From the title track, an album was built around it. Three additional songs on the album were composed by Anderson. Other songs were cover versions of songs recorded by others. Among these tracks was Ray Price's "For the Good Times" and Kris Kristofferson's "Me and Bobby McGee".

Release and reception
Where Have All the Heroes Gone was released in December 1970 and was his third studio album released that year. It was issued as a vinyl LP, with five songs on side one and six songs on side two of the record. The album spent a total of 11 weeks on the Billboard Top Country Albums chart before peaking at number 27 in April 1971. The title track was the only single released from the album. Issued in September 1970, the song reached number six on the Billboard Hot Country Singles chart by December. It also reached a peak of number 93 on the Billboard Hot 100, one of his few singles to chart on that list. It also reached number 9 on the RPM Country Singles chart in Canada. In later years the album would be reviewed by Allmusic, which gave it a rating of 3.5 out of 5 possible stars.

Track listing

Personnel
All credits are adapted from the liner notes of Where Have All Our Heroes Gone.

Musical personnel
 Bill Anderson – lead vocals
 Harold Bradley – guitar
 Ray Edenton – guitar
 Buddy Harman – drums
 Roy Huskey – bass
 The Jordanaires – background vocals
 Grady Martin – guitar
 Hargus "Pig" Robbins – piano
 Hal Rugg – steel guitar
 Pete Wade – guitar

Technical personnel
 Owen Bradley – record producer

Chart performance

Release history

References

1970 albums
Albums produced by Owen Bradley
Bill Anderson (singer) albums
Decca Records albums